Perfume: The Story of a Murderer is a 2006 period psychological thriller film directed by Tom Tykwer and starring Ben Whishaw, Alan Rickman, Rachel Hurd-Wood, and Dustin Hoffman. Tykwer, with Johnny Klimek and Reinhold Heil, also composed the music. The screenplay, by Tykwer, Andrew Birkin and Bernd Eichinger, is based on Patrick Süskind's 1985 novel of the same name. Set in 18th-century France, the film tells the story of Jean-Baptiste Grenouille (Whishaw), an olfactory genius, and his homicidal quest for the perfect scent.

Producer Eichinger bought the film rights to Süskind's novel in 2000 and began writing the screenplay together with Birkin. Tykwer was selected as the director and joined the two in developing the screenplay in 2003. Principal photography began on July 12, 2005 and concluded on October 16, 2005; filming took place in Spain, Germany, and France. The film was made on a budget of €50 million (est. $60 million), making it one of the most expensive German films.

A co-production of Germany, France, Spain and the United States, Perfume was released on September 14, 2006 in Germany, December 26, 2006 in the United Kingdom, and December 27, 2006 in the United States. It grossed over $135 million worldwide, of which over $53 million was made in Germany. Critics' reviews of the film were mixed; the consensus was that the film had strong cinematography and acting but suffered from an uneven screenplay.

Plot

The film begins with the sentencing of Jean-Baptiste Grenouille, a notorious murderer. Between the reading of the sentence and the execution, the story of his life is told in flashback, beginning with his abandonment at birth in a French fish market. Raised in an orphanage, Grenouille grows into a strangely detached boy with a superhuman sense of smell. After growing to maturity as a tanner's apprentice, he makes his first delivery to Paris, where he revels in all the new scents. He focuses on a redheaded girl selling yellow plums, following her and repeatedly attempting to sniff her, but startles her with his behavior. To prevent her from crying out, he covers the girl's mouth and unintentionally suffocates her. After realizing that she is dead, he strips her body naked and smells her all over, becoming distraught when her scent fades. Afterwards, Grenouille is haunted by the desire to recreate the girl's aroma.

After making a delivery to a perfume shop, Grenouille amazes the Italian owner, Giuseppe Baldini, with his ability to identify and create fragrances. He revitalizes the perfumer's career with new formulas, demanding only that Baldini teach him how to preserve scents. Baldini explains that all perfumes are harmonies of twelve individual scents and may contain a theoretical thirteenth scent. Grenouille continues working for Baldini but is saddened when he learns that Baldini's method of distillation will not capture the scents of all objects. Baldini informs Grenouille of another method that can be learned in Grasse and agrees to help him by providing the journeyman papers he requires in exchange for 100 new perfume formulas. Right after Grenouille departs, Baldini dies when the shaky building, along with his studio, collapses. En route to Grasse, Grenouille decides to exile himself from society, taking refuge in a cave. During this time, he discovers that he lacks any personal scent himself and believes this is why he is perceived as strange or disturbing by others. Deciding to continue his quest, he leaves his cave and continues to Grasse.

Upon arrival in Grasse, Grenouille catches the scent of Laure Richis, the beautiful, redheaded daughter of the wealthy Antoine Richis, and decides that she will be his "thirteenth scent", the linchpin of his perfume. Grenouille finds a job in Grasse under Madame Arnulfi and learns the method of enfleurage. He kills a young lavender picker and attempts to extract her scent using the method of hot enfleurage, which fails. After this, he attempts the method of cold enfleurage on a prostitute he hired, but she becomes alarmed and tries to throw him out. He murders her and successfully preserves the scent of the woman. Grenouille embarks on a killing spree, targeting beautiful young women and capturing their scents using his perfected method. He dumps the women's naked corpses around the city, creating panic. After preserving the first twelve scents, Grenouille plans his attack on Laure. In church, after the Bishop of Grasse declares that the murderer has been excommunicated, it is announced that a man has confessed to the murders. Richis remains unconvinced and secretly flees the city with his daughter, telling no one their destination. Grenouille tracks her scent to a roadside inn and sneaks into her room that night, murdering her.

Soldiers capture Grenouille moments after he finishes preparing his perfume. On the day of his execution, he applies the perfume on himself, forcing the jailers to release him. The executioner and the crowd in attendance are speechless at the beauty of the perfume; they declare Grenouille innocent before falling into a massive orgy. Richis, still convinced of Grenouille's guilt, threatens him with his sword, but he is then overwhelmed by the scent and embraces Grenouille as his "son." Walking out of Grasse unscathed, Grenouille has enough perfume to rule the world, but has discovered that it will not allow him to love or be loved like a normal person. Disenchanted by his aimless quest, he returns to the Parisian fish market where he was abandoned as a child and pours the remaining perfume over his head. Overcome by the scent and in the belief that Grenouille is an angel, the nearby crowd devours him. The next morning, all that is left are his clothes and the empty bottle, from which one final drop of perfume falls.

Cast 
 Ben Whishaw as Jean-Baptiste Grenouille
 Alan Rickman as Antoine Richis  
 Rachel Hurd-Wood as Laure Richis  
 Dustin Hoffman as Giuseppe Baldini
 Sian Thomas as Madame Gaillard  
 Corinna Harfouch as Madame Arnulfi    
 Sam Douglas as Grimal 
 Birgit Minichmayr as Grenouille's mother
 Karoline Herfurth as redheaded girl selling plums
 Carlos Gramaje as Police Lieutenant
 David Calder as Bishop of Grasse
 Jessica Schwarz as Natalie
 Joanna Griffiths as Marianne
 Sara Forestier as Jeanne
 Timothy Davies as Chenier
 Paul Berrondo as Druot
 John Hurt as the narrator (English version) 
 Otto Sander as the narrator (German version)
 Jacques Perrin as the narrator (French version)

Production

Development

Perfume: The Story of a Murderer is based on the 1985 novel by Patrick Süskind, which has sold over 20 million copies worldwide. Süskind reportedly thought that only Stanley Kubrick and Miloš Forman could do the book justice and refused to let anyone else adapt it to film.  Bernd Eichinger, the film's producer, read the novel when it was first released and immediately approached Süskind, who was also a friend of his, to obtain the film rights — Süskind refused. In 2000, Süskind relented and sold Eichinger the rights. Eichinger had to take out a personal loan because the supervisory board of Constantin Film refused to approve the selling price. He is rumored to have paid €10 million for the film rights. The author had no involvement in the project. Artist/director Julian Schnabel wanted to direct a film version of the novel and wrote a script based on the novel. However, Eichinger, who owned the rights to the novel at the time, disliked Schnabel's stream of consciousness-driven narrative of the story and that project was never materialized. Schnabel eventually transferred his unique approach of his Perfume script into his 2007 film, The Diving Bell and the Butterfly.

Eichinger and screenwriter Andrew Birkin began to write a draft script. Eichinger says that their biggest problem was a narrative one, "The main character doesn't express himself. A novelist can use narrative to compensate for this; that's not possible in film. An audience can usually only get a feeling for a character if the character speaks", said Eichinger. Eichinger said, "With material like this it is especially important for a director to get involved in the script." Eichinger met with a number of directors but felt that only Tom Tykwer was really in tune with the material. In 2003, Tykwer was invited to join Eichinger and Birkin in adapting the novel. The screenplay went through over 20 revisions to get to the final shooting script. The three writers worked hard to create a faithful adaptation that captured the atmosphere and climate of the novel, yet, at the same time, have a specific and individual perspective, in terms of the story and the main character.

The film had a production budget of €50 million (US$63.7 million), making it one of the most expensive German film productions. The film was financed by Constantin Film, of which Eichinger was the former CEO; billionaire Gisela Oeri and VIP Medienfonds. Perfume is Oeri's first investment into a film and she also served as a co-producer. The film received €200,000 in funding from the German Federal Film Board (FFA)'s German–French Agreement fund. Eurimages also granted the film €600,000 in co-production funding. The film received €400,000 in funding  from the German Federal Film Board. The film received production funding of €1.6 million from FilmFernsehFonds Bayern, €1 million from the German Federal Film Board and €750,000 from Filmstiftung NRW. The film received distribution funding of €205,000 from FilmFernsehFonds Bayern, €180,000 from the German Federal Film Board and €150,000 from the Bavarian Bank Fund.

Andreas Schmid, CEO of VIP Medienfonds ('Medienfonds' is a German term for a type of closed investment fund) and one of the film's executive producers, was arrested in October 2005 on suspicion of fraud and tax evasion. The resulting investigation revealed some irregularities in the financing of Perfume, suggesting that some investors may have invested in the film as a vehicle for tax evasion (to acquire tax losses). According to documents Schmid filed to tax authorities, VIP invested €25 million into the film. But according to Constantin Film's ledgers, VIP only put up €4.1 million. The remainder of the €25 million was banked to collect interest, secure bank guarantees and used to pay back investors their share of the film's revenue. As VIP claimed the whole €25 million was used to produce the film, its investors were also able to write off their entire contribution against tax. Perfume also received €700,000 in state subsidies from Filmstiftung NRW based on the €4.1 million figure. In November 2007, Schmid was found guilty of multiple counts of tax evasion and sentenced to six years in prison. He had already served more than two years in jail since his arrest.

Casting

Filming was originally planned to begin in the third quarter of 2004 but the filmmakers had trouble finding the right actor to play the protagonist Grenouille. The search to find an actor to play Grenouille took nearly a year. On casting agent Michelle Guish's advice, Tykwer went to see Ben Whishaw perform as Hamlet in Trevor Nunn's production of the play. Tykwer immediately felt that he had found the actor for the role. An audition followed which convinced Eichinger of Whishaw's potential as well. Eichinger described Whishaw as embodying both "the innocent angel and the murderer." Regarding his search to find an actor, Tykwer said "it only really seemed plausible to choose someone for this role who was completely unknown. You could also say a 'nobody' who is to become a 'somebody' - because that's what the story is about too."

When it came to casting the role of Baldini, the washed-up perfumer who first teaches Grenouille how to capture smells and create perfume, Tykwer immediately thought of Dustin Hoffman. "When I took on this project I knew straight away that there was no one who could play Baldini better," said Tykwer. Hoffman had wanted to work with Tykwer since he saw Run Lola Run and Tykwer had always wanted to get Hoffman for a part. Hoffman and Whishaw had a week of rehearsal and a crash course in perfume-making prior to the start of principal photography. The scenes between the two actors were shot in sequence, allowing them to follow the natural progression of their characters' relationship.

Alan Rickman was Tykwer's first choice to play Richis and the role was not offered to anyone else. Tykwer and Eichinger looked through hundreds of audition tapes to find the right actress for the role of Richis' daughter Laure. Tykwer believed he had found the right actress on a tape with 15 actresses but couldn't remember exactly which was the one he liked. Eichinger looked through the tape and found what he thought was a suitable person. It turned out that both men had chosen the same actress, Rachel Hurd-Wood. Tykwer went to London to cast her personally. A new tape was recorded and she was given the role. A suitable actress could not be found for the role of the plum girl in England and the United States, so Tykwer decided to look at actresses in Germany. Karoline Herfurth, who had twice worked with Tykwer, was asked to do a screen test with Whishaw, in costume. Herfurth proved herself to Tykwer and her role was expanded.

A total of 5,200 extras were used for the film, sometimes with nearly a thousand at once. The orgy scene at the film's climax required 750 extras. 50 key players from the dance theater group La Fura dels Baus and 100 relatively experienced talents formed the core of the crowd. The remaining 600 extras were arranged around this group of 150 performers.

Design

To help define the film's look the crew watched period films such as Sleepy Hollow, Amadeus, Oliver Twist, Barry Lyndon, From Hell, The Elephant Man, Dracula, Brotherhood of the Wolf, Vidocq, and Les Misérables. Cinematographer Frank Griebe said that of all the films they watched that had been shot on location, none of them really had the dirt and grit of the city that they desired for Perfume. "We needed a filthy city to get the real feel for the smells of it", said Griebe. Tykwer wanted to recreate 18th-century Paris, as seen through the eyes of the lower-class Grenouille and said that he wanted to shoot the film "as if we were thrown into a time machine with a camera."

Tykwer describes the film as having "a distinctly dark aesthetic", due to both the lack of adequate lighting during the film's time period and the nature of its storyline. The filmmakers took inspiration from painters that specialized in darkness with few sources of light such as Caravaggio, Joseph Wright of Derby and Rembrandt. The film begins with a cool, monochromatic color palette, and as Grenouille discovers more scents, the palette warms and opens up. In the scenes where Grenouille goes to Paris for the first time, the filmmakers subtly added more powerful colors in the sets, costumes, props and lighting to represent Grenouille's experience of the new smells.

One of the main challenges of making the film was to convey the smells and the world of scents that Grenouille experiences. Tykwer said that to him Perfume "was much more a film about the importance of smell in our life than a film that tries to be smelly." The filmmakers strived to convey smell visually without the use of colors or special effects, Griebe says "people see the fish market full of raw, bloody fish, and they know it stinks; they see a field of lavender and know it smells wonderful. We show Grenouille taking in smells by cupping his nose, and by doing close shots of his nose, and that's it!"

Pierre-Yves Gayraud, the film's costume designer, spent fifteen weeks researching 18th century fashion. Production of over 1,400 costumes, in addition to the preparation of shoes, hats and other accessories were completed within three months by workshops in and around Bucharest in Romania. The costume department had to make the clothing look worn and dirty. Additionally, the actors were required to wear the costumes and more or less live in them prior to shooting. The character Grenouille was not given any white clothing and wore bluish over-garments throughout most of the film because the filmmakers wanted to depict him as a shadow and a chameleon. Instead of dressing the character of Laure in the colorful regional dress that was the tradition of the time, she was dressed in the less vivid tones of a Parisian damsel to highlight her social aspirations as well as her red hair.

Filming
Although the filmmakers needed an 18th-century French setting, shooting the film in its original setting of Paris was unlikely due to the extensive modernization of the city in the 19th century. Croatia was initially considered as an alternative because of its earthy scenery and pristine old-world towns, but even though the price was right, the distance between locations proved to be disadvantageous. In the end, the filmmakers opted to shoot most of the film in Catalonia, Spain which, although more expensive than Croatia, offered locations which were closer to each other.

Principal photography began on July 12, 2005 at Rolling Thunder Skate Park. and concluded on October 16, 2005. The first fifteen days was spent entirely on the largest stage of Bavaria Film Studios in Munich, shooting the scenes between Baldini and Grenouille in the former's workshop. All of the scenes with Hoffman were completed within the first eleven days. Most of the remaining scenes were shot in Catalonia, Spain, specifically in Barcelona, Girona and Figueres. The streets of Barcelona stood in for those of Paris. El Barri Gòtic (the Gothic Quarter), part of Barcelona's historic town center, was converted into a Parisian fish market. Poble Espanyol, an open-air museum in Barcelona, was the location for the climactic orgy scene. To create an authentic dirty look, the film's crew included a "dirt unit" of about 60 people whose job was to distribute detritus over the city. Two and a half tons of fish and one ton of meat was dispersed in El Gòtic. Several mountain and forest scenes were shot in the environs of Girona. The city also provided the location of the home and studio of Madame Arnulfi. Sant Ferran Castle in Figueres provided the location for the tannery, the Paris city gates and the dungeon in which Grenouille is imprisoned. The cave in which Grenouille discovers he has no scent was also located in Figueres. Some landscape shots, including those used as Grasse's lavender fields, were filmed in Provence, France in late June 2005, before principal photography started.

The cinematographer for Perfume was Frank Griebe, with whom Tykwer has worked on all of his films. The film was shot on Arri cameras and lenses. For sequences which required the camera to be extremely close to its subject, Griebe used the Kenworthy/Nettman Snorkel Lens System. Griebe shot the film on 3-perf Super 35 film using three Kodak Vision2 film stocks — 500T 5218, 200T 5217 and 100T 5212. 5218 was used for all the night scenes and the choice between the other two were determined by weather conditions — 5212 when it was very sunny and 5217 whenever it was overcast. Tykwer and Griebe originally discussed shooting Perfume in the traditional Academy 1.33:1 aspect ratio, but they decided against it because of the difficulty of theatrical exhibition. "We felt 1.33:1 was perfect for many aspects of this story, but today you can't release a 1.33 film in theaters," said Griebe.

Post-production
Post-production took place in Munich and required nine months to complete, concluding in the third quarter of 2006. Film editor Alex Berner was present at all the shooting locations and was on set with Tykwer. Berner also cut dailies as filming progressed which, according to Tykwer, saved a lot of time later. Tykwer said they had to work this way due to the film's tight schedule (the European release dates had already been locked). On every night of filming, Tykwer and Griebe would take screenshots from the dailies and make notes for the film laboratory on what sort of tone and palette they wanted, and the level of brightness and contrast they wanted for the prints. A digital intermediate was used for the film. About three months was spent grading the film. Digital grading tools were used to improve the color of the lavender fields because the film crew had arrived a week early and the flowers were not in full bloom. In the scene where Grenouille murders the plum girl, selective coloring was used to take the tone of the dead body's flesh from its natural color to a pale white color.

Visual effects work, of which there were about 250 shots, was carried out by Universal Production Partners in Prague. Much of the visual effects work for the film consisted of minor CGI corrections, such as wire removals; and a lot of crowd manipulation and set extensions. Scale models were used to create the shots of the Seine river bridge with houses on it.

Music
As with all of Tykwer's films since 1997's Winter Sleepers, the musical score for Perfume was composed by Tykwer and two of his friends Johnny Klimek and Reinhold Heil. The score was performed by the Berlin Philharmonic and State choir Latvija under the direction of conductor Simon Rattle. Tykwer began composing the score with Klimek and Heil the very day he started working on the screenplay. Tykwer said, "I feel like I understand very much about the structure and the motivations of the characters when I'm writing the script, but I really do understand the atmosphere and the emotional and the more abstract part of the film when I'm investigating the music, and when I'm planning the music for it. ... When I then come to the shooting, having worked for three years on the music and three years on the script, I really feel like I know exactly the two worlds and how to combine them." By the time it came to shooting the film, a substantial portion of music had been composed. Tykwer hired a small orchestra and recorded them performing the score. Tykwer played the recorded music on set so people could explore the atmosphere and the acoustic world of the film while they were acting in it. The music was also used instead of temp music during editing.

Release

Marketing
To coincide with the film's release, clothing and fragrance company Thierry Mugler released a fifteen-piece perfume coffret. The perfumes were a collaboration between Thierry Mugler's Vera Struebi and Pierre Aulas and International Flavors & Fragrances' Christophe Laudamiel and Christoph Hornetz. Laudamiel read the novel in 1994 and began recreating odors from it in 2000; Hornetz joined the project in 2002. 14 of the fragrances were inspired by the novel and film, the 15th works as a fragrance enhancer but can also be worn on its own. Smells represented by the perfumes include Paris in 1738, a virgin's navel, a clean baby and leather. The coffret was released as a limited edition of 1,300 sets which sold for US$700 each; all 1,300 sets were sold.

Box office
The film was a financial success, especially in Europe, earning $135,039,943 worldwide. It opened in Germany on September 14, 2006 and was number one on the box office charts in its first three weeks. The film made $9.7 million in its opening weekend and an estimated 1.04 million people saw the film in its first four days of release in Germany. The film ended up selling over five million tickets and grossed $53,125,663, the highest German gross for a dramatic film. The film's strong performance in Germany was attributed in part to a large marketing campaign and numerous premieres throughout the country.

By comparison, the film performed poorly in North America. The film had a three-theater limited release on December 27, 2006 before being expanded to 280 theaters on January 5, 2007. The film completed its theatrical run in North America on March 1, 2007, taking in a modest $2,223,293 overall. Roger Ebert attributes its poor US box office performance to the film "getting lost in the Christmas rush."

Home media
The film was released on DVD (in three configurations) and HD DVD in Germany by Highlight on March 15, 2007. The standard edition DVD and the HD DVD contain the film and three audio commentary tracks — one by Tykwer, one by production designer Uli Hanisch and his assistant Kai Karla Koch, and one by Griebe and editor Alexander Berner. The two-disc special edition DVD's extra features include the same audio commentary tracks as on the standard edition, a making-of, interviews with the cast and crew, and six featurettes. The DVD was also released in a numbered, limited edition "Fascination of Smell" configuration which came in a wooden box containing five small bottles of the Thierry Mugler perfumes in addition to the same material as the special edition DVD. Only 7,777 units were available and it was sold exclusively by Müller. A Blu-ray Disc version of the film, which contained the same extra features as the special edition DVD, was released on November 8, 2007. The DVD sold 300,000 units in its first 14 days of release in Germany and sold 600,000 units by May 22, 2007. As of May 15, 2009, 1.15 million DVD and Blu-ray units of the film have been sold in the country. In the United States, 387,520 DVD units have been sold as of the latest figures, translating to $7,547,755 in revenue.

Reception

Critical response

, on Rotten Tomatoes, the film had a 59% approval rating based on 129 reviews with an average rating of 6.2/10. The website's critics consensus reads: "Perfume is what you'd expect from a Tom Twyker-directed movie glamorizing a serial killer: a kinetic visual feast, with a dark antihero that's impossible to feel sympathy for." On Metacritic, the film had a weighted average score of 56 out of 100 based on reviews from 30 critics, indicating "mixed or average reviews".

The Hollywood Reporters Bernard Besserglik described the film as a "visually lush, fast-moving story", stating that the director "has a sure sense of spectacle and, despite its faults, the movie maintains its queasy grip". Dan Jolin of Empire gave the film four out of five stars and said "The odd conclusion renders it somewhat oblique, but Perfume is a feast for the senses. Smell it with your eyes..." A. O. Scott of The New York Times gave the film a negative review, saying "Try as it might to be refined and provocative, Perfume: The Story of a Murderer never rises above the pedestrian creepiness of its conceit." Scott also said that Whishaw "does not quite manage to make Grenouille either a victim worthy of pity or a fascinating monster. [...] In the film he comes across as dull, dour and repellent."

James Berardinelli of Reelviews.net gave the film two and a half out of four stars, saying "There's a mesmerizing appeal to the director's in-your-face style, even if the images he displays are often repugnant. Unfortunately, Tykwer is working with a flawed screenplay and even the most arresting visuals cannot compensate for the movie's schizophrenic story." Roger Ebert was very enthusiastic giving the film four out of four stars and wrote "It took imagination to tell it, courage to film it, thought to act it, and from the audience it requires a brave curiosity about the peculiarity of obsession." Ebert included it on his list of best films of the year, and named Perfume as "the most underappreciated movie of the year".

Boyd van Hoeij of European-Films.net said "Tykwer's sane decision to prefer traditional craftsmanship over computer-generated imagery and a highly intelligent screenplay that hews very close to the spirit of the novel put Perfume way ahead of its competitors." Van Hoeij later named Perfume: The Story of a Murderer one of the ten best films of 2006. Varietys Derek Elley said the film was an "extremely faithful" adaptation, but felt the film was slightly too long and "more liberties should have been taken to make the novel work on the screen".

Reviews of the cast were mixed. Whishaw's performance was praised by many critics. Boyd van Hoeij said Whishaw was "a revelation in a very difficult role that is mostly mute and certainly ugly." The San Francisco Chronicles Mick LaSalle said "Whishaw succeeds in making the repulsive protagonist thoroughly repulsive, which is probably a testimony to his acting ability." The casting of Dustin Hoffman as Baldini was criticized by several critics. The Los Angeles Times''' Carina Chocano called his performance "disconcertingly kitsch and over the top". Conversely, Rickman's performance as Richis was well received.

AccoladesPerfume: The Story of a Murderer was nominated for five Saturn Awards at the 33rd Saturn Awards — Best Action/Adventure/Thriller Film, Best Director (Tykwer), Best Writing (Birkin, Eichinger, Tykwer), Best Supporting Actress (Hurd-Wood), and Best Music (Tykwer, Klimek, Heil). At the 2007 European Film Awards, Frank Griebe won the award for Best Cinematographer and Uli Hanisch won the European Film Academy Prix d'Excellence for his production design work. The film also received nominations in the People's Choice Award, Best Actor (Ben Whishaw) and Best Composer (Tykwer, Klimek, Heil) categories. At the 2007 Germany Film Awards, the film won the Silver Best Feature Film award and the awards for Best Cinematography, Best Costume Design, Best Editing, Best Production Design and Best Sound. It also received nominations for Best Direction and Best Film Score. At the 2007 Bavarian Film Awards, Tykwer and Hanisch won awards for Best Director and Best Production Design categories, respectively. Eichinger, Tykwer and Whishaw received the award for their work on Perfume'', which won the 2006 Bambi Award in the Film – National category.

See also

 Cinema of Germany
 List of films based on crime books

References

External links

 
 
 
 
 

2006 films
2000s fantasy thriller films
2006 psychological thriller films
German fantasy thriller films
German psychological thriller films
French fantasy thriller films
French psychological thriller films
Spanish fantasy thriller films
American fantasy thriller films
American psychological thriller films
Paramount Pictures films
DreamWorks Pictures films
Summit Entertainment films
Constantin Film films
Metropolitan Filmexport films
Davis Films films
Filmax films
Castelao Producciones films
Ikiru Films films
Pathé films
Nordisk Film films
Magic realism films
Films about capital punishment
Films about orphans
Films based on German novels
Films directed by Tom Tykwer
Films set in the 1730s
Films set in the 1740s
Films set in the 1750s
Films set in the 1760s
Films set in France
Films set in Paris
Films shot in Barcelona
Films shot in Spain
Films shot in France
Films shot in Germany
Films with screenplays by Tom Tykwer
Films scored by Tom Tykwer
Films scored by Reinhold Heil
Films scored by Johnny Klimek
German serial killer films
Films produced by Bernd Eichinger
Films with screenplays by Bernd Eichinger
English-language German films
English-language French films
English-language Spanish films
2000s English-language films
2000s French films
2000s German films
2000s Spanish films
2000s American films
Spanish psychological thriller films